The Civil Human Rights Front (CHRF) was an organisation that focused on the issues of Hong Kong politics and livelihood, affiliated with almost all pan-democratic camps in Hong Kong. It was founded on 13 September 2002 and disbanded on 15 August 2021.

Forty-eight NGOs and political groups were involved in the organisation in January 2006. The most well-known event held by the CHRF was the Hong Kong 1 July marches.

Organisational development
Civil Human Rights Front was founded on 13 September 2002, with the aim to provide a platform consolidating voices and powers from various groups and spectrum of the societies in order to advance the development in the human and civil rights movements.

The initial aim was to focus on the enactment of the legislation of Article 23 of the Basic Law. After the protest in 2003, the organisation started to diversify its mandate, to include issues such as equal opportunities and authorities given to the police.

Since 2017 they have been lobbying the Hong Kong government through the United Nations Universal Periodic Review (UPR) process as one of the main Hong Kong UPR Coalition Steering Committee members alongside Justice Centre Hong Kong, PEN Hong Kong, and Hong Kong Watch.

Arrest of Figo Chan 
In April 2020, then-vice-convener, also known as co-convener of the organisation, Figo Chan, was arrested as part of a crackdown on pro-democracy activists who organised and participated in unlawful assemblies. In May 2020, he appeared before the West Kowloon magistrates' court and was granted bail. There, he said that "demonstrating is not a crime".

2021 coalition exodus, national security law and allegations of foreign funding 
After the charging of 47 pro-democracy activists and politicians under the national security law (including the indictment of former convener Jimmy Sham Tsz-kit), the organisation was questioned by pro-Beijing media as to whether it had a right to exist under the current security laws. In March 2021, the Democratic Party and the teachers' union withdrew from the Front. Convener Figo Chan confirmed this but did not explain further. Also in the same month, a Singaporean newspaper quoted officials from the Hong Kong government saying that the Front was funded by the US agency National Endowment for Democracy, which is illegal under the national security law as "colluding with foreign forces"; both, former convener Sham and current convener Chan denied the allegations. On the threat of disbandment, Chan said that "[F]or this reason, we will not and cannot disband, and I, as its convenor, am absolutely willing to live and die with the Front as long as there are still member groups that remain."

2021 arrest of Jimmy Sham and conviction of Figo Chan 
On 6 January 2021, Jimmy Sham was arrested along dozens others amidst a crackdown on pro-democracy figures and participants of the pro-democracy primaries. Sham was rearrested on 28 February 2021 on subversion charges and awaits trial as of late May 2021. Also in late May 2021, the group's convener Figo Chan was convicted over an unlawful assembly in 2019 and handed a 18 months' imprisonment term, leading the group temporarily leaderless.

Member organisations
The following civic organisations and political parties are members of CHRF.
 Student Christian Movement of Hong Kong
 Hong Kong Journalists Association
 Hong Kong Council of the Church of Christ in China
 Civic Party
 Power for Democracy
 Democratic Party
 Pioneer Group
 Asia Monitor Resource Centre
 League of Social Democrats
 Hong Kong Human Rights Monitor
 Hong Kong Human Rights Commission
 The Chinese University of Hong Kong Student Union
 Justice and Peace Commission of the H.K. Catholic Diocese
 Hong Kong Catholic Commission For Labour Affairs
 Hong Kong Alliance in Support of Patriotic Democratic Movements of China
 Hong Kong Democratic Development Network
 Hong Kong Social Workers' General Union
 Hong Kong Informal Education Research Centre
 Hong Kong Christian Institute
 Hong Kong Women Christian Council
 Hong Kong Professional Teachers' Union
 Unison
 Hong Kong Confederation of Trade Unions
 Christians for Hong Kong Society
 Rainbow Action
 Sham Shui Po Community Association
 Zi Teng
 Neighbourhood and Worker's Service Centre
 New World First Bus Company Staff Union
 Association for the Advancement of Feminism
 Kwai Chung Estate Christian Basic Community
 People Planning In Action
 Neo Democrats
 Labour Party
 Joint Office of Councillors Au Nok-hin & Lo Kin-hei
 iDemocracy Asia
 Cross Border Children Concern Coalition
 League in Defense of Hong Kong's Freedoms
 Leung Kwok-hung Legislative Council Member's Office
 April Fifth Action
 Hong Kong Association for Democracy and People's Livelihood
 Hong Kong Women Workers' Association
 Hong Kong Branch of the Chinese Democratic United Front (中國民主聯合陣線香港分部)
 Grassroots Cultural Center (草根文化中心)
 Hong Kong Sex Society (香港性學會)
 Hong Kong Women's League (香港女同盟會)
 University of Abode (居港權大學)
 Cen Yonggen Community Service Office (岑永根社區服務處)

References

 
History of Hong Kong
Politics of Hong Kong
Protest marches